Chelnik (Bulgarian: Челник) - a village in South-Eastern Bulgaria in the Yambol Province, in the Tundzha Municipality. According to the National Institute of Statistics, in the year of 2011, the village had 300 inhabitants.

References

Villages in Yambol Province